The Evil Stairs (also known as The Devil's Stairway) is a 1964 South Korean mystery film directed by Lee Man-hee.

Synopsis
A chief surgeon kills the nurse with whom he is having an affair after he becomes engaged to be married to the hospital director's daughter. After disposing of the nurse's body in a lake, he becomes tormented by her spirit, and in a confused mental state, kills his fiancée.

Cast
Kim Jin-kyu as Hyeon Gwang-ho
Moon Jung-suk as Nam Jin-suk
Bang Seong-ja as O Jeong-ja
Jeong Ae-ran
Choi Nam-Hyun
Yu Gye-seon
Jo Hang
Kim Ung
Jeong Cheol
Ji Bang-yeol

References

Bibliography

 

1964 films
1960s Korean-language films
1960s mystery films
South Korean mystery films
Films directed by Lee Man-hee (director)